The New Zealand Sea Cadet Corps (also known as Navy Cadets, SCC, and Sea Cadets) is one of the three corps in the New Zealand Cadet Forces, the other two being the Air Training Corps, and New Zealand Cadet Corps. It is a military-style training organisation for young people between the ages of 13 and 21. Activities include sailing, and boat work, ropework shooting and drill, amongst other activities, many of which involving the other branches of the NZCF. Cadets need to pass an annual swimming test to undertake water-based activities.

History
The SCC traces its roots back to 1929 when the first open Sea Cadet unit was formed in Christchurch, by the Canterbury Navy League. Units formed in the four main centres and were controlled nationally by the Canterbury branch of the League.

RS Feva introduction into service 
Around 2006 the Sea Cadet Corps began research into acquiring a new and modern fleet of sailing craft for Cadet training. The Sea Cadet Corps Boats Officer, LT R. Glover sought feedback from every Navy Cadet unit in the country as to their requirements and thoughts about the new fleet. The result of this project was the selection of the RS Feva, manufactured in the United Kingdom. The first seven RS Feva's arrived in New Zealand in October 2009 through the importer, Takapuna Sailing Centre (Boats Bits Ltd.). A second delivery of five vessels arrived later in 2009, with each of the 17 units around the country having at least one craft by mid 2010.

The RS Feva is the first new class of training vessels the New Zealand Sea Cadet Corps has adopted since 1978.

Master Cadet Rank 
In 2011 the rank of Master Cadet was replaced by the more generic rank of Under Officer with the last Master Cadet's being either Commissioning or leaving the NZCF by the end of 2012.

Organisation

National
The SCC is managed at a national level by the Commandant (usually a Regular Force Lieutenant-Colonel/Wing Commander/Commander), and their staff at Defence Force Headquarters in Wellington. It is supported by the Sea Cadet Association of New Zealand.

Area
The country is divided into 3 areas, Northern (Northern half of the North Island), Central (Southern half of the North Island) and Southern (entire South Island). Each area has a NZCF Training and Support Unit (CFTSU), commanded by NZDF Senior Non-commissioned Officer or Commissioned Officer. Area Coordinator, with advisors for Sea Cadet Corps units.

Unit

Each unit is managed by the Cadet Unit Commander, and their officers. Sea Cadet Corps units are commonly referred to as "Training Ships"

A typical unit has between one and four officers filling various roles. The Cadet Unit Commander appoints all personnel in the unit to their positions. Each unit has an Adjutant, Training Officer, and Stores Officer. These positions are usually filled by a commissioned officer (officers can hold multiple positions if necessary). One or more of the positions may have assistants, the assistants are often junior officers or Senior NCOs.

Each unit also has a cadet NCO holding the position of Ships Coxswain (COXN), this individual will almost always hold the rank of Warrant Officer (personnel occasionally are bestowed the position without the rank, however, this is a rare occurrence and only when the individual is close to meeting the promotional requirements). If the Training Ship is large enough, each division of cadets may be led by a Chief Petty Officer. The Ships Coxswain is normally responsible for supervising all the NCOs in their various tasks, as a result, the Coxswain can skip the normal chain of command, enabling them to liaise directly with the Unit Commander.

Uniform and Insignia

Insignia 
The uniform worn by SCC members is the same as that of the Royal New Zealand Navy, except that for all ranks, the lettering on the bottom of the rank insignia shoulder boards reads "CADET FORCES" rather than "NEW ZEALAND" to differentiate SCC personnel from RNZN personnel. Officer Ceremonial Dress Uniforms have a shoulder flash reading "NEW ZEALAND CADET FORCES" rather than "NEW ZEALAND" for the same reason. Cadets wear a cap ribbon on their caps with the wording 'T.S. (Name of Ship)', while officers and officer cadets wear the same cap insignia as RNZN officers.

Unlike the Air Training Corps and the New Zealand Cadet Corps, Cadets of the SCC do not wear a brassard. Badges such as the marksman badge are still awarded however are only worn on their ceremonial uniforms (full blues).

Badges 
Good Conduct Badge - Up to three may be awarded to a Cadet for each year of enrolled service during which their conduct is satisfactory and attendance is regular.

Seamanship Badge - This is the primary qualification of attainment for Sea Cadets. The RNZN Coxswains badge is used to denote this achievement.

Uniforms 
The Sea Cadet Corps follows the Royal New Zealand Navy with regards to uniform standards and clothing items, with all mandatory clothing being issued from the RNZN. In the past the system used was that a unit would be graded 1-5 based on the quantity of personnel that attended a units parade night. Based on that grading the unit would then be issued an annual allowance for the unit to order new uniform as replacements or to provide to new cadets. The Sea Cadet Corps currently operate the following uniforms.

In December 2020 a major overhaul was announced. In combination with the update to cadet net, new uniform will be issued directly to a new cadet upon their enrolment into a squadron. Unit equipment officers will source measurements for each cadet and enter them into CadetNet. The cadet will then be issued with uniform. Units will still maintain a local supply of uniform as spares however the bulk of uniform issued to new recruits will come from Headquarters New Zealand Cadet Forces.

Cadet Working Dress 
First Introduced in August 2021 the Sea Cadet Corps and Air Training Corps have adopted a single multipurpose uniform named 'Cadet Working Dress' (CWD) that replaces the General Working Dress (GWD) currently used by the Sea Cadet Corps as its primary non ceremonial uniform. The Air Training Corps will adopt the uniform first to free up DPM for the New Zealand Cadet Corps. The style of the uniform is modeled off the RNZAF's General Purpose Uniform however lacks the flame retardant feature of the RNZAF version, this isn't seen as a necessity due to cadets rarely catching fire. This switch away from RNZN GWD is to allow a more streamlined logistics approach to working dress that will see costs decrease due to the much larger Air Training Corps being the primary consumer of the uniform.

While the uniform will be made of the same material and from the same supplier the uniform will retain the darker blue colour of the GWD

Cadets and Officers will be issued a set of Cadet Working Dress upon being issued their Half Blues and Full Blues uniform as part of the integrated logistics platform that will see new cadets issued a 'pack' of equipment and uniform from New Zealand Cadet Forces Headquarters.

As well as the key components, the New Zealand Cadet Forces intends to role out accessories such as matching rain jackets for cadets to either be supplied with outright, or purchase through the NZCF directly. More accessories are yet to be announced how ever warm weather equipment such as jerseys have been speculated by NZCF personnel.

The supplier for the Cadet Working Dress is based in Fiji. As a result, the 2021 outbreak of COVID-19 production and shipping of CWDs was reduced, delaying the introduction of the uniform. By early July 2021 the first shipment had arrived to the S4 Logistics team in Christchurch.

Navy Cadet Working Dress is scheduled to role out from late 2021 to early 2022.

Ranks 
All active Sea Cadets are able to work towards being promoted. The size of each Training Ship dictates the quantity of each rank that a unit is allowed.

Non-Commissioned Officer Ranks 
Cadet Non-Commissioned Officer Ranks are based on the RNZN ranks; and are:

The CDT prefix/suffix is used to distinguish regular force personnel from those of the Cadet Forces.

However, whilst not all cadets become NCOs, all get the chance to train and progress through the different levels of training, Ordinary Cadet, 1 Star, 2 Star, and 3 Star levels, by demonstrating knowledge and skills in subjects including cadet forces knowledge, general service knowledge, leadership, firearms safety, and seamanship studies.

Commissioned Officer Ranks
Sea Cadet Corps Officers also follow the RNZN Rank structure, and are:

Note: All instances of Lieutenant are pronounced "Leftenant" in line with the United Kingdom Ministry of Defence pronunciation.

While New Zealand Cadet Forces Officers hold commissions on behalf the New Zealand Parliament, via the Minister of Defence. They are not entitled to be saluted by New Zealand Defence Force personnel. Due to the rank emblems being identical other than the "New Zealand" and "Cadet Forces" identifier, occasionally Cadet Force Officers are saluted by NZDF personnel, if this happens Cadet Force Officers are encouraged to return the salute to be polite.

New Zealand Cadet Force Officers do not hold precedence of rank over NZDF personnel e.g. a Cadet Force Lieutenant Commander has no authority to issue orders to a NZDF Ensign or Non-Commissioned Officers.

New Zealand Cadet Force Officers continue to undergo training throughout their career, following the yet to be released NZCF 170O.

Membership

Cadet members 
Interested personnel can join between the ages of 13 to 15 (or if attending the first year of high school) and can stay on without being promoted to the age of 18. Senior Non-Commissioned Officers may serve until their 20th birthday. The exception is the sole school-based unit, as opposed to city or regional based units. Hamilton's Fraser High School Cadet Unit permits all students enrolled at the school to enroll in the unit.

Other than black lace up shoes, all uniform is provided upon enrolment into a unit and completion of a training camp where wearing of the uniform is taught. Bonds are sometimes held to ensure that they are returned.

Fees 
Unit fees are set by each unit Parent Support Committee annually. Due to fluctuating operating costs, these vary from unit to unit dependent on the type of activities the unit has planned, although typically fees will be no more than $200 annually.

Adult members

Adult Cadets 

In 2017 the New Zealand Cadet Forces updated their Child Protection policy surrounding cadets who are either Non-Commissioned Officers or personnel who are completing cadet level training that are aged 18 and over.

There is a deliberate delineation between an 'Adult' and an 'Officer' as the latter has specific authority to exercise command and control over cadets and other NZCF Officers.

The key difference between a cadet who is an adult and a cadet who is under 18 is that adult cadets and indeed all adults within the New Zealand Cadet Forces are charged with the responsibility of maintaining the safety and welfare of cadets during all NZCF activities. While this doesn't mean that cadets who are classified as adults hold authority over other cadets due to their age, it means that adult cadets are expected to at the very least vocalize to an Officer or Supplementary Staff member when they believe safety and welfare have been compromised.

Cadet Non-Commissioned Officers who are 18 or older are issued a thin white band which is sewn into the rank slide of the individual immediately above the "CADET FORCES" lettering and below the rank emblem.

Officers and Supplementary Staff 
Adult members can serve in two capacities: commissioned officers or Supplementary Staff. Officers are commissioned into the New Zealand Cadet Forces, with the post-nominal letters NZCF, at the rank of second lieutenant, and can be promoted to lieutenant, captain or major after completing the necessary training and service.

In 2014 the organisation introduced a new position of National Support Officer (NSO). This position was designed to place a New Zealand Cadet Force Officer at high level of influence within HQNZCF, which traditionally had his position had been solely occupied by New Zealand Defence Force Personnel. In 2016 with the adoption of the continental staff system the position was renamed to Assistant Commandant. If he or she is an NZCC officer, as opposed to an ATC or SCC officer, they will hold the rank of Lieutenant Colonel.

Officers are unpaid volunteers, therefore they receive no pay for routine parades and unit activities. They are paid when attending training courses run by the New Zealand Defence Force.

Supplementary Staff or SS for short, are civilians who help train cadets. They do not wear uniform, but they are generally treated similarly to officers by cadets. Members of the NZDF are occasionally attached to cadet units to assist in conducting training. This is normally because they know a cadet/officer in that unit, or if they have a particular interest in cadet forces. They are addressed as "Instructor" or by cadets choice, "Sir" or "Ma'am".

Fees 
Most NZCF Officers do not pay any membership fees, this is typically to balance the time and effort put in by NZCF Officers. While Officers are not encouraged to, a large amount contribute anyway, by way of purchasing stationary and equipment for their unit.

Activities

The Duke of Edinburgh's Hillary Award

Officers and Adults 
Any Commissioned Officer in the  NZCF or Supplementary Staff member that has an active security clearance is eligible to become an award facilitator, allowing cadets within their unit to actively participate in the award and allows any progress towards the award to be signed off. There is no limit to the number of staff members that can be award facilitators, allowing larger units to focus a staff member to each section of the award.

While the award is directed towards young adults and within the NZCF specifically, the cadets and NCOs, Junior Officers and adults under the age of 25 are also eligible to complete any of the awards (although the Gold award would be the most reasonable).

Cadet Participation 
Run in partnership with the Duke of Edinburgh's Hillary Awards the award is a multi year, voluntary, non-competitive programme of practical, cultural and adventurous activities, designed to support the personal and social development of young people aged 14–25, regardless of gender, background or ability. It offers an individual challenge and encourages young people to undertake exciting, constructive, challenging and enjoyable activities in their free time.

Personnel undertaking the award can begin the activity either through their school, a third party provider, or the New Zealand Cadet Forces with more than 9,000 young adults undertaking the programme each year.

Within the frame of the New Zealand Cadet Forces, parade nights and community service events like Anzac Day parades can count towards the service requirement while weekend camps and courses can count towards the skill section of the awards. The Cadet Fieldcraft Activity can also count towards the Adventurous Journey for all three awards. Cadets are also able to retroactively claim work up to 3 months of work they've done before signing up for their first award. For example, if a cadet completed a NZCF promotional course such as the Senior Non-Commissioned Officer Course shortly before signing up for an award, then they would be able to retroactively use the course for their residential project.

Cadets that successfully complete an award are entitled to wear the pin of the highest award they receive on their brassard (if Air Training Corps or New Zealand Cadet Corps) or Jacket (if Sea Cadet Corps).

Parade Nights
Every unit holds Parade Nights around 2–3 hours long weekly during school terms. Each parade night usually begins and ends with a parade. The starting parade is used to inspect uniforms, and to inform the cadets on the parade night's activities. The final parade to inform the cadets on upcoming events in the unit. Between the parades, the cadets undergo classroom, or practical instruction.

Shooting
Units conduct regular range training with smallbore rifles. Some units have their own armouries and ranges at their parade hall. Cadets must pass a DFTT (Dry firing training test) before being allowed on the range. Each year the Smitt Trophy shooting competition is held between all the Sea Cadet Units in New Zealand.

Ceremonial Parades & Events 
Participating in community activities such as Anzac Day, Armistice Day and Sea Sunday services are part of a Navy Cadet unit routine. They are often asked to participate in public events which help us raise a community profile.

Boat work & Rigging
Develop and maintain safe seamanship skills in power, sail, oar, and paddle craft, and learn the correct way to utilise ropes and pulleys. Each unit has and operates 2 Crown's, 2 RS Feva's, and various support vessels.

Damage Control Exercises 
Damage Control(DC) in cadet forces is all about learning how to understand the theory of how dangerous situations can occur and what steps can be taken to mitigate said situations. After learning the theory behind DC opportunities can often arise for cadets to get some first-hand experience dealing with real fires or other forms of DC.

International Exchanges 
Each year dozens of sea cadets go on exchange programs through ISCEP (International Sea Cadet Exchange Program), run through the International Sea Cadet Association this facilitates exchanges to countries such as South Korea, Hong Kong, Australia, Canada, The United States of America, the United Kingdom, and more.

Local exchanges are also held, for example each year an exchange occurs between the Royal Canadian Sea Cadets and units from the lower Northern Area and upper Central Area. Designated "CANEX" this is one of many exchanges that happen outside of the ISCEP.

Ship Visits 
When Royal New Zealand Navy ships visit local ports, Sea Cadet Corps units are invited to view the ship, to run recruiting the events, or often both. Sea Cadets often receive a more personalised tour of the vessel and are occasionally able to stay on the ship while it transits between cities in New Zealand.

Merchant naval vessels and foreign naval vessels also extend invitations to Sea Cadet Corps units to visit in a similar capacity to the RNZN.

Local Training 
Each Unit holds at least one night per week in order to undertake the Cadet Development Framework. Each unit employs a training officer whose role it is to create and implement a local training programme. The Cadet Development Framework is a four-year program which provides cadets with the opportunity to develop skills in leadership, aviation knowledge, drill, firearms training, fieldcraft, and more.

The programme provides standardisation for training and expected development within Cadet Units for CDT(E) – CDTWO(E). Some content is applicable to all three Corps of the NZCF, whilst some is specific to particular Corps.

The content of the Four-Year Training Programme is not designed to fill every period during parade nights in a calendar year, but intentionally leaves scope for Cadet Unit Commanders to add content that will add value to their communities, strengthen Unit identity and provide opportunities for cadets that they may not receive outside of NZCF. However, only completion of the prescribed training will ensure that cadets can continue moving through the development model. Delivery of the content of the Four-Year Training Programme is at Cadet Unit Commander's discretion. In time, further resources to assist in delivery will be developed, including parade night lesson plans, instructor guides and additional resources. Currently available resources should be used in the first instance for delivery of training. Where gaps in knowledge or skills exist, Area Advisors and/or Area Support Officers should be engaged.

The training is split in to three different levels off learning that correspond with a cadets progression.

 Lead Self - Years 1-2
 Lead Teams - Year 3+
 Lead Leaders - Year 4+

Courses

Tri-Corps Courses
 Junior NCO Course
 Senior NCO Course
 Cadet Fieldcraft Activity
Officer Fieldcraft Activity
Officers Commissioning Course
Officers Instructional Technique & Training Management Course
Officers Command Course
Shooting Coaches Course

SCC Courses
 Cadet Coxswain Course
Officer Marine Supervisor
 Sea Time

Competitions

Regatta 
Area Sea Cadet Skills (also known as Area Regatta)
 National Sea Cadet Skills (also known as National Regatta)

National Efficiency Competition
Each year, the Sea Cadet Association of New Zealand (SCANZ) holds a competition for the most efficient unit in the country.  Each area (Northern, Central and Southern) selects one unit, which is awarded either Charles Palmer Cup, The HMNZS Gambia Shield, or the South Island Annual Efficiency Shield, respectively. Then a naval officer inspects each of the three units chosen and selects the winning unit. The winning unit earns the Ex-Royal Navalmans Trophy which they are entitled to keep for a year, and earns a placement for one cadet aboard the sail training ship Spirit of New Zealand.

Shooting Competitions

Smit Trophy 
The Smit Trophy shooting competition represents the New Zealand Sea Cadet Corps national shooting competition. All NZCF Training Ships are eligible for the competition.

This trophy was presented to the New Zealand Navy Board by the directors of E.J. Smit and Zoom of Westbroek, Netherlands, builders of HMS PRIZE to perpetuate the deeds of the ship in her wartime role and of her commanding officer (Lieutenant Commander W.E. Sanders VC, DSO, RNR). The trophy is presented annually to the winner of the Sea Cadet Corps small-bore postal shoot.

This competition also represents one of the only opportunity for New Zealand Sea Cadet Corps personnel to earn the NZCF Marksman Badge. In order to be awarded the badge a cadet must, while competing in the Smit Shooting Competition achieve a score of 80% or more. The other Two Badges are awarded under this competitions ruleset.

There is a common misconception that NZCF personnel can only attain the marksman badge in the Wallingford competition. This is not the case. The NZCF 160 Competitions and Awards Manual states the following.

Ffennell Shooting Competition 
The Ffennell competitions are a group of small-bore rifle matches for the youth of the Commonwealth. New Zealand Cadet Forces units contest the Class B competitions (using issued rifles and sights). The matches are held under the authority of the Commonwealth Postal Competitions Committee (CPCC). All international correspondence on behalf of the CPCC will be handled by the Council for Cadet Rifle Shooting.
The aim of these team matches is to encourage the Youth of the Commonwealth to participate in the sport of small-bore target rifle shooting.

Entry is open to any unit or sub-unit of the following:

 New Zealand Cadet Forces;
 Junior Servicemen of the New Zealand Defence Forces in one establishment; and
 Other youth groups approved by the CPCC.

Units may enter one or more teams. Each team shall consist of eight firers. A shooter cannot shoot on more than one team. The team captain may or may not be one of these eight. All members of the team must be under the age of 19 years on the day of firing the match, and be serving members of the same unit or sub-unit.

Each team member will fire two cards, 10 rounds to count being fired at each card, with two rounds fired at each aiming mark. Sighting shots will be completed before the practice begins. The whole team need not complete shooting in one day. Highest Possible Score (HPS) is 200. Team HPS is 1600.

See also 
List of Training Ships in the Sea Cadet Corps

Sea Cadets
 International Sea Cadet Association
 United Kingdom Sea Cadet Corps
 Other nations' Sea Cadet Corps

Navy League
Navy League of New Zealand

References

External links
 Training Ship Taupo Mana, Porirua Sea Cadet Unit.
Training Ship Achilles Central Auckland Sea Cadet Unit.
Training Ship Leander North Shore, Auckland Sea Cadet Unit.
Training Ship Waikato Hamilton & Waikato Sea Cadet Unit
Training Ship Talisman Nelson Sea Cadet Unit.
International Sea Cadet Association
New Zealand Cadet Forces Web Site
www.seacadets.co.nz Training Ship Tutira (Levin)

New Zealand Cadet Forces
Youth organisations based in New Zealand